Anjir Bazuiyeh (also Romanized as Anjīr Bāzū’īyeh and Anjīr-e Bāzū’īyeh) is a village in Dalfard Rural District, Sarduiyeh District, Jiroft County, Kerman Province, Iran. At the 2006 census, its population was 84, in 23 families.

References 

Populated places in Jiroft County